Bismuth  is a chemical element that has the symbol Bi and atomic number 83. This heavy, brittle, white crystalline trivalent other metal has a pink tinge and chemically resembles arsenic and antimony.

Of all the metals, it is the most naturally diamagnetic, and only mercury has a lower thermal conductivity.  It is also generally considered as the last naturally occurring non-radioactive element.

Bismuth compounds are used in cosmetics and in medical procedures. As the toxicity of lead has become more apparent in recent years, alloy uses for bismuth metal as a replacement for lead have become an increasing part of bismuth's commercial importance.

List of producing countries
This is a list of bismuth producing countries in 2017.
* indicates "Natural resources of COUNTRY" links.

References

Lists of countries by mineral production
Production by country